Donald Chambers may refer to:

 Don Chambers, author and artist of the Mannequins comic strip 
 Donald Eugene Chambers, founder of the Bandidos motorcycle gang
 Donald Chambers (author), councillor and heritage advocate in Victoria, Australia